John Holland (August 25, 1838 – 1917) was a prominent American businessman and industrialist whose eponymous company, John Holland Gold Pen Company, was a large maker of pens and related products during the late 19th century.  In his business activities, he made several metallurgical and mechanical advancements, the most notable being a process for creating stable bars and other usable forms of iridium.

Early years
He was born on August 25, 1838, in Kilcrohane, County Cork, Ireland, and emigrated, with his parents, to the United States in 1848.  The family settled in Cincinnati, Ohio, where he stayed for the rest of his life.  He served an apprenticeship, then worked for the pen maker George W. Sheppard.  In 1862, he acquired the entire business and quickly expanded it.

Success
Before 1900, the John Holland Pen Company was a major fountain pens manufacturer. George S. Parker, founder of the most famous brand at the time, was a reseller. In 1880, Holland discovered the ability to melt and make castings of iridium by fusing the white-hot ore with phosphorus, and patented the process in the United States. He invoked the help of William Lofland Dudley in getting rid of the phosphorus, who did so by repeated applications of lime at great heat. This is the first reported method of refining iridium. Dudley then found new applications for iridium, and formed the American Iridium Company with Holland.

Death and decline
After John Holland's death in 1917 the company started to decline, and was closed around 1950.

References 

 The Biographical Encyclopaedia of Ohio of the Nineteenth Century, published 1882.  reprinted at:
 Chemistry Conquering Iridium. The New York Times, May 13, 1881
 A History of Iridium, Overcoming the Difficulties of Melting and Fabrication, L. B. Hunt, The Johnson Matthey Group

External links 
 Pen Gallery photos and information on a John Holland pen
 Ad from the John Holland Gold Pen Company
 History of the John Holland Gold Pen Company
 A company history

Irish emigrants to the United States (before 1923)
1838 births
1917 deaths
19th-century American businesspeople